Gacaca, Living Together Again In Rwanda? is the first documentary film in a trilogy by Anne Aghion examining the aftermath of the Rwandan genocide. Directed by  Anne Aghion and produced by Dominant 7, Gacaca Productions, and Planète, this 2002 film won UNESCO's Fellini Prize. Filmed in Rwanda, the language of Gacaca is Kinyarwanda with English subtitles. In Kinyarwanda, gacaca means "grass", which was the location of the reparation trials in Rwanda.

Synopsis
The first film in this award-winning trilogy ventures into the rural heart of Rwanda. Follow the first steps in one of the world’s boldest experiments in reconciliation: the Gacaca (Ga-CHA-cha) Tribunals. These are a new form of citizen-based justice aimed at unifying this country of 8 million people after the 1994 genocide which claimed over 800,000 lives in 100 days. While world attention is focused on the unfolding procedures, award-winning documentarian Anne Aghion bypasses the usual interviews with politicians and international aid workers, skips the statistics, and goes directly to the emotional core of the story, talking one-on-one with survivors and accused killers alike. In this powerful, compassionate and insightful film, with almost no narration, and using only original footage, she captures first-hand how ordinary people struggle to find a future after cataclysm.

References

External links
 Official website
 
 
Inkiko Gacaca

2002 films
Rwandan short documentary films
Documentary films about the Rwandan genocide
Kinyarwanda-language films
2002 short documentary films
UNESCO
Films directed by Anne Aghion